Thorbergur Thorvaldson (August 24, 1883 – October 4, 1965) was an Icelandic-Canadian chemist. He was the head of the Department of Chemistry at the University of Saskatchewan.

Thorvaldson and his team at the National Research Council developed a sulphate-resistant cement in 1919 which prevented decay and deterioration in existing structures. He served as president of the Canadian Institute of Chemistry in 1941. In 1946 he was named first dean of graduate studies at the University of Saskatchewan.

Biography
Thorvaldson's family settled in Gimli, Manitoba.  Thorvaldson graduated from the University of Manitoba with honours.

Awards

He was made a Knight ( Riddari ) in the Order of the Falcon ( Hin íslenska fálkaorða ) in 1939.

Henry Marshall Tory Medal was awarded to Thorbergur Thorvaldson, FRSC Professor Emeritus at the University of Saskatchewan in 1951.

Other honours 
The official dedication ceremony of the Chemistry Building on the University of Saskatchewan campus was held June 1966 wherein the building was named in honour of Thorbergur Thorvaldson.  Thorvaldson was a pioneer researcher in the development of cement that would not deteriorate in alkaline ground water areas.

In 1966, Thorvaldson Lake in northern Saskatchewan was named in his honour.

Thorvaldson Lake Location:

References

See also
 Order of the Falcon
 Henry Marshall Tory Medal

1883 births
1965 deaths
Canadian chemists
Academic staff of the University of Saskatchewan
Canadian university and college chief executives
Icelandic scientists
Recipients of the Order of the Falcon
People from Saskatoon
Scientists from Saskatchewan
Icelandic emigrants to Canada
Fellows of the Royal Society of Canada